La Binchoise is a beer brewery in Binche, Belgium. The brewery was founded in 1986 by husband and wife Graux-Jauson, unemployed at the time. They set up their business at home, but soon moved to the building of an old malthouse and quickly achieved commercial success, gaining a gold medal at the annual beer festival in Chicago. For a while their beer was made in a cauldron formerly owned by the Belgian National Guard. Their beers are refermented in the bottle.

Types of beers
Blonde tradition
Brune tradition
Reserve speciale
Rose des Remparts

References

External links
Company website The brewery's restaurant website

1986 establishments in Belgium
Belgian brands
Breweries of Wallonia
Companies based in Hainaut (province)
Binche